Pieter Adriaan Flach (born 8 April 1961, Sneek) is a Dutch computer scientist and a Professor of Artificial Intelligence in the Department of Computer Science at the University of Bristol. He is author of the acclaimed Simply Logical: Intelligent Reasoning by Example (John Wiley, 1994) and Machine Learning: the Art and Science of Algorithms that Make Sense of Data (Cambridge University Press, 2012).

Education
Flach received an MSc Electrical Engineering from Universiteit Twente in 1987 and a PhD in Computer Science from Tilburg University in 1995.

Research
Flach's research interests are in  data mining and machine learning.

References

1961 births
Living people
Artificial intelligence researchers
Dutch computer scientists
British computer scientists
Machine learning researchers
People from Sneek
University of Twente alumni
Tilburg University alumni
Academics of the University of Bristol